The Vineyard may refer to:

The Vineyard (film), a 1989 film starring James Hong
The Vineyard (magazine), a magazine published in London, England from 1910 to 1922
The Vineyard (Bel Air, Maryland), listed on the US National Register of Historic Places
The Vineyard, Fulham, a Grade II listed house in Fulham, London, England
The Vineyard Hotel, Newlands, Cape Town, South Africa
The Vineyard Hotel, Newbury, Berkshire, England
The Vineyard, Oxford, a house in Oxford, England
The Vineyard, Dublin, a cricket ground in Dublin, Ireland
 The Vineyard, Richmond, a street in Richmond, London
The Association of Vineyard Churches
Martha's Vineyard, an island in Massachusetts
The Vineyard (American TV series), a 2013 American reality show based on residents and visitors of the island
 The Vineyard (Spanish TV series), a 2021 Spanish limited television series.

See also
 Vineyard (disambiguation)